Barbara Gaile Romack (November 16, 1932 – October 15, 2016) was an American professional golfer.

Romack was born in Sacramento, California. She won the North and South Women's Amateur at Pinehurst in 1952, the Canadian Women's Amateur in 1953, and then in 1954, she defeated Mickey Wright in the finals to win the U.S. Women's Amateur. Her playing brought an invitation to the White House and President Dwight Eisenhower became a great friend.

In 1955, Romack finished second to Jessie Valentine in the British Ladies Amateur played at the Royal Portrush Golf Club in Northern Ireland. Her golfing performances earned her the cover of Sports Illustrated on April 16, 1956. In May 1957, she married Edward Wayne "Bud" Porter, an associate golf professional at course in her native Sacramento.

Romack was the runner-up to Anne Quast in the 1958 U.S. Women's Amateur. A member of the U.S. Curtis Cup team in 1954, 1956, and 1958, Romack joined the LPGA Tour in 1958. Her only official tour win was the 1963 Rock City Ladies Open. She won on the senior tour and remained involved with the game of golf throughout her life. She worked for the USGA as a volunteer. At one time she served as vice-president of the LPGA.

On February 21, 1968, Romack was on a Delta Air Lines flight when it was hijacked by Lawrence Rhodes. After three hours, Romack and the rest of the passengers were released.

Romack died in October 2016, aged 83.

Amateur wins
1952 North and South Women's Amateur, California State Women's Amateur
1953 Canadian Women's Amateur
1954 U.S. Women's Amateur, California State Women's Amateur
1956 California State Women's Amateur
1958 California State Women's Amateur
South Atlantic Amateur (three times)

Professional wins

LPGA Tour wins (1)

LPGA Tour playoff record (1–0)

Other wins
1960 Leesburg Pro-Am

Team appearances
Amateur
Curtis Cup (representing the United States): 1954 (winners), 1956, 1958 (tie)

References

External links

Golfer has helped mold next generation

American female golfers
LPGA Tour golfers
Winners of ladies' major amateur golf championships
Golfers from Sacramento, California
People from The Villages, Florida
Hijacking survivors
1932 births
2016 deaths
21st-century American women